The 2022–23 Plunket Shield is the 94th season of the Plunket Shield, the domestic first-class cricket competition that was played in New Zealand. The tournament started on 18 October 2022, and the final round of matches is scheduled to take place in March 2023. Auckland were the defending champions, having won their 24th title the previous year.

In their second-round match against Canterbury, Wellington were dismissed for just 80 runs in their first innings and 87 runs in their second, setting a new record-lowest score across two completed innings of a Plunket Shield match, and Wellington's lowest score in any first-class match since 1887.

Table

Fixtures

Round 1

Round 2

Round 3

Round 4

Round 5

Round 6

Round 7

Round 8

Notes

References

External links
 Series home at ESPN cricinfo

Plunket Shield
2022–23 New Zealand cricket season
Plunket Shield